The Karale Glacier is one of the major glaciers in the area north of Kuummiit, Greenland.

See also
List of glaciers in Greenland

Glaciers of Greenland